Ronald Henry Ward (1 December 1915 – 1 August 2000) was a New Zealand rugby union player. A flanker, Clark represented ,  and, briefly,  at a provincial level. He was a member of the New Zealand national side, the All Blacks, in 1936 and 1937, playing four matches for the team including three internationals. Ward's playing career was effectively truncated by World War II, but between 1957 and 1961 he was coach and selector of the Southland team.

References

1915 births
2000 deaths
People from Riverton, New Zealand
New Zealand rugby union players
New Zealand international rugby union players
Southland rugby union players
Hawke's Bay rugby union players
Canterbury rugby union players
Rugby union flankers
New Zealand rugby union coaches
People educated at Central Southland College